Caroline Merola (born 1962) is a Canadian illustrator and author living in Quebec.

Life
Merola was born in Montreal, Quebec and received a college-level diploma in plastic arts from the Collège Jean-de-Brébeuf and a bachelor's degree in fine art from Concordia University.

Her children's books have been translated into English, Czech and Arabic.

She was host for the Télé-Métropole program Plexi-Mag and she contributed to the magazine Titanic.

Selected works 
 Cent Dangers, comic book (1986)
 La maison truquée, comic book (1994)
 Le Rêve du collectionneur, comic book (1994)
 Le roi des loups, children's book (1998)
 N'aie pas peur, Nic, children's book (2001), finalist for a Mr. Christie's Book Award
 L'Amateur, comic book (2003)
 La vache qui lit, children's book (2004)
 Une nuit en ville, children's book (2007)
 Lili et les poilus, children's book (2011), received a Governor General's Award for French-language children's illustration

References 

1962 births
Living people
Artists from Montreal
Canadian children's writers
Canadian comics artists
Concordia University alumni
Canadian female comics artists
Governor General's Award-winning children's illustrators
Writers from Montreal